Ignacy Pieńkowski (1877–1948) was a Polish painter and pedagogue active primarily in Krakow. He was the brother of the prominent physicist Stefan Pieńkowski. In 1892, he was educated at an Art school in Warsaw under Wojciech Gerson. He continued his studies in Krakow under Teodor Axentowicz and Leon Wyczółkowski. He travelled across the world, to Brazil, Russia, Germany, and the United States.

External links
Ignacy Pienkowski on artnet at www.artnet.com

1877 births
1948 deaths
19th-century Polish painters
19th-century Polish male artists
20th-century Polish painters
20th-century Polish male artists
Polish male painters